Barbora Koseková (born 22 November 1994) is a Slovak female volleyball player. She is part of the Slovakia women's national volleyball team. She competed at the 2019 Women's European Volleyball Championship.

Clubs
  VVG Grimma (2004–2006)
  ŠŠK Bilíková Bratislava (2006–2011)
  VK Slávia EU Bratislava (2011–2016)
  VK KP Brno (2016–2017)
  Linamar Békescsaba (2017–2018)
  UVT Agroland Timișoara (2018–2018)
  VTC Pezinok-Bilíkova (2019–2019)
  Fatum Nyíregyháza (2019–present)

References

External links 

 Profile on CEV

1994 births
Living people
Slovak women's volleyball players
Sportspeople from Bratislava